Rudkhaneh Bar Rural District is a rural district (dehestan) in the Rudkhaneh District of Rudan County, Hormozgan Province, Iran. At the 2006 census, its population was 7,431, in 1,636 families.  The rural district has 34 villages.

References 

Rural Districts of Hormozgan Province
Rudan County